The purpose of this page is to provide supplementary materials for the ordinary least squares article, reducing the load of the main article with mathematics and improving its accessibility, while at the same time retaining the completeness of exposition.

Derivation of the normal equations
Define the th residual to be

Then the objective  can be rewritten

Given that S is convex, it is minimized when its gradient vector is zero (This follows by definition: if the gradient vector is not zero, there is a direction in which we can move to minimize it further – see maxima and minima.) The elements of the gradient vector are the partial derivatives of S with respect to the parameters:

The derivatives are

Substitution of the expressions for the residuals and the derivatives into the gradient equations gives

Thus if  minimizes S, we have

Upon rearrangement, we obtain the normal equations:

The normal equations are written in matrix notation as

 (where XT is the matrix transpose of X).

The solution of the normal equations yields the vector  of the optimal parameter values.

Derivation directly in terms of matrices

The normal equations can be derived directly from a matrix representation of the problem as follows. The objective is to minimize

Here  has the dimension 1x1 (the number of columns of ), so it is a scalar and equal to its own transpose, hence 
and the quantity to minimize becomes

which is equivalent to the above-given normal equations. A sufficient condition for satisfaction of the second-order conditions for a minimum is that  have full column rank, in which case  is positive definite.

Derivation without calculus

When  is positive definite, the formula for the minimizing value of  can be derived without the use of derivatives. The quantity

can be written as

It follows that  is equal to

and therefore minimized exactly when

Generalization for complex equations

In general, the coefficients of the matrices   and  can be complex. By using a Hermitian transpose instead of a simple transpose, it is possible to find a vector  which minimizes , just as for the real matrix case. In order to get the normal equations we follow a similar path as in previous derivations:

where  stands for Hermitian transpose.

For the  we have

and the derivatives change into

After rewriting  in the summation form and writing  explicitly, we can calculate both partial derivatives with result:

which, after adding it together and comparing to zero (minimization condition for ) yields

In matrix form:

Least squares estimator for β 

Using matrix notation, the sum of squared residuals is given by

 

Since this is a quadratic expression, the vector which gives the global minimum may be found via matrix calculus by differentiating with respect to the vector  (using denominator layout) and setting equal to zero:

 

By assumption matrix X has full column rank, and therefore XTX is invertible and the least squares estimator for β is given by

Unbiasedness and variance of  

 

where E[ε|X] = 0 by assumptions of the model.

For the variance, let the covariance matrix of  be 
(where  is the identity  matrix), and let X be a known constant.
Then,

 

Expected value and biasedness of  
First we will plug in the expression for y into the estimator, and use the fact that X'M = MX = 0 (matrix M projects onto the space orthogonal to X):

 

Now we can recognize ε′Mε as a 1×1 matrix, such matrix is equal to its own trace. This is useful because by properties of trace operator, tr(AB) = tr(BA), and we can use this to separate disturbance ε from matrix M which is a function of regressors X:

 

Using the Law of iterated expectation this can be written as

 

Recall that M = I − P where P is the projection onto linear space spanned by columns of matrix X. By properties of a projection matrix, it has p = rank(X) eigenvalues equal to 1, and all other eigenvalues are equal to 0. Trace of a matrix is equal to the sum of its characteristic values, thus tr(P) = p, and tr(M) = n − p. Therefore,

 

Note in the later section “Maximum likelihood” we show that under the additional assumption that errors are distributed normally, the estimator  is proportional to a chi-squared distribution with n – p degrees of freedom, from which the formula for expected value would immediately follow. However the result we have shown in this section is valid regardless of the distribution of the errors, and thus has importance on its own.

Consistency and asymptotic normality of  
Estimator  can be written as
 
We can use the law of large numbers to establish that 
 
By Slutsky's theorem and continuous mapping theorem these results can be combined to establish consistency of estimator :
 

The central limit theorem tells us that
  where  

Applying Slutsky's theorem again we'll have

Maximum likelihood approach 
Maximum likelihood estimation is a generic technique for estimating the unknown parameters in a statistical model by constructing a log-likelihood function corresponding to the joint distribution of the data, then maximizing this function over all possible parameter values. In order to apply this method, we have to make an assumption about the distribution of y given X so that the log-likelihood function can be constructed.  The connection of maximum likelihood estimation to OLS arises when this distribution is modeled as a multivariate normal.

Specifically, assume that the errors ε have multivariate normal distribution with mean 0 and variance matrix σ2I. Then the distribution of y conditionally on X is
 
and the log-likelihood function of the data will be
 
Differentiating this expression with respect to β and σ2 we'll find the ML estimates of these parameters:
 
We can check that this is indeed a maximum by looking at the Hessian matrix of the log-likelihood function.

Finite-sample distribution 
Since we have assumed in this section that the distribution of error terms is known to be normal, it becomes possible to derive the explicit expressions for the distributions of estimators  and :
 
so that by the affine transformation properties of multivariate normal distribution

 

Similarly the distribution of  follows from

 

where  is the symmetric projection matrix onto subspace orthogonal to X, and thus MX = X′M = 0. We have argued before that this matrix rank n – p, and thus by properties of chi-squared distribution,
 

Moreover, the estimators  and  turn out to be independent (conditional on X), a fact which is fundamental for construction of the classical t- and F-tests. At the same time, the estimator  is a norm of vector Mε divided by n, and thus this estimator is a function of Mε. Now, random variables (Pε, Mε) are jointly normal as a linear transformation of ε, and they are also uncorrelated because PM = 0. By properties of multivariate normal distribution, this means that Pε and Mε are independent, and therefore estimators  and  will be independent as well.

Derivation of simple linear regression estimators

 

 

Now, take the derivative with respect to :

 

And finally substitute  to determine 

 

Article proofs
Least squares